Tsembeho (or Tsémbehou) is a town located on the island of Anjouan in the Comoros.
it is the third largest city of Anjouan.

External links
http://www.tsembehouinfo.net/

Populated places in Anjouan